Houari Djemili (born 15 May 1987) is an Algerian footballer as a goalkeeper for RC Kouba in the Algerian Ligue Professionnelle 2.

References

External links

1987 births
Living people
Association football goalkeepers
Algerian footballers
JS Saoura players
21st-century Algerian people